JoAnn Trejo is an American pharmacologist, cell biologist and professor in the Department of Pharmacology at the School of Medicine at University of California, San Diego.  She is also the assistant vice chancellor for Health Sciences Faculty Affairs. Trejo studies cell signalling by protease-activated G protein-coupled receptors (GPCRs). She is also actively involved in mentoring, education and outreach activities to increase the diversity of science.

Education 
Trejo grew up the youngest of five children in a single-parent household. Trejo obtained her bachelor's of science in toxicology and biochemistry from University of California, Davis in 1986. She earned her PhD and MBA at University of California, San Diego in 1992 and 2015, respectively.

Career 
Trejo completed a postdoctoral fellowship at the University of California, San Francisco. In 2000, she joined the faculty at University of North Carolina, Chapel Hill. In 2008, she was recruited to University of California, San Diego as a tenured faculty member and was promoted to full professor in 2012. In 2014, she was appointed vice chair of the Department of Pharmacology. In 2015, she became the associate dean for Health Sciences Faculty Affairs and was appointed vice chancellor in 2019.

Research interests 
Trejo studies the regulatory mechanisms that control signalling by protease-activated  G protein-coupled receptors (GPCRs) in normal physiology and disease. She is best known for her discoveries that reveal how cellular responses are regulated by G protein-coupled receptors in the context of vascular inflammation and breast cancer.

Mentoring and outreach activity 
Trejo is an advocate for inclusion and diversity, particularly to promote women and underrepresented groups in science and academia. In particular, she is the director for the National Institutes of Health-funded Institutional Research and Academic Career Development Award (IRACDA) Postdoctoral Training Program at University of California, San Diego, which aims to increase diversity of the professoriate. Trejo also leads several NIH-funded programs to enhance research development and success of underrepresented early career faculty.

Awards 
Trejo has received several awards for her research, mentoring and outreach efforts. In 1993, she received the University of California President's Postdoctoral Fellowship Award. In 1995, she received the American Heart Association Scientist Career Development Grant Award. In 2006, she won the American Heart Association Established Investigator Award. In 2012, she was recognized by the San Diego Business Journal with the Women Who Mean Business Award. In 2014, Trejo received the UC San Diego Chancellor's Award for Excellence in Postdoctoral Scholar Mentoring. In 2015 she received the Ruth Kirchstein Diversity in Science Award from the  American Society for Biochemistry and Molecular Biology. In 2016, she received the UC San Diego Equal Opportunity/Affirmative Action and Diversity Award. In 2017, she was awarded the E.E. Just Award by the American Society for Cell Biology (ASCB). In 2018, Trejo received the NIH/NIGMS R35 Outstanding Investigator Award. In 2020 Trejo was awarded the ASCB Prize for Excellence in Inclusivity for her diversity efforts. She was named to Cell Mentor's list of 100 Inspiring Hispanic/Latinx Scientists in America and also elected Fellow of the American Society for Cell Biology in 2020. In 2021, Trejo was elected to the National Academy of Medicine.

References 

American pharmacologists
Women pharmacologists
American women biologists
University of California, Davis alumni
Year of birth missing (living people)
Living people
20th-century American biologists
21st-century biologists
University of California, San Diego alumni
University of California, San Diego faculty
21st-century American women
Members of the National Academy of Medicine
20th-century American women scientists